Marcos Vinícius de Jesus Araújo (born 24 December 1994), known as Marcos Vinícius, is a Brazilian footballer who plays as an attacking midfielder.

Club career
Marcos Vinícius was born in Marabá, Pará, and after short spells at Corinthians and Bahia, joined Náutico in 2010, aged 15. He subsequently graduated with the latter and made his professional debut on 14 September 2011, coming on as a second-half substitute for Lenon in a 1–2 away loss against Bragantino for the Série B championship.

Marcos Vinícius made his Série A debut on 29 May 2013, again from the bench in a 0–3 home loss against Vitória. He scored his first goal in the category on 2 June, netting a last-minute equalizer in a 2–2 home draw against Portuguesa.

On 10 November 2014 Marcos Vinícius was loaned to Cruzeiro until December 2015, with a buyout clause. On 4 April of the following year, after only appearing with the side in Campeonato Mineiro, Raposa bought 50% of his rights.

Honours

Club
Botafogo
 Campeonato Carioca: 2018

References

External links

1994 births
Living people
Sportspeople from Pará
Brazilian footballers
Association football midfielders
Campeonato Brasileiro Série A players
Campeonato Brasileiro Série B players
Sport Club Corinthians Paulista players
Esporte Clube Bahia players
Clube Náutico Capibaribe players
Cruzeiro Esporte Clube players
Botafogo de Futebol e Regatas players
Associação Chapecoense de Futebol players
Botafogo Futebol Clube (SP) players
Santa Cruz Futebol Clube players
Expatriate footballers in Cambodia
Brazilian expatriate sportspeople in Cambodia
Visakha FC players
Cambodian Premier League players